The blue riverdamsel, Pseudagrion microcephalum is a common species of damselfly in the family Coenagrionidae.
It is also known as the blue sprite and blue grass dart.

Distribution
This species can be found in the Australian states of New South Wales, Northern Territory, Queensland, Victoria and Western Australia. It can also be found in Asia: Bangladesh, China, Guangxi, Hong Kong, Hainan, Indonesia, India, Japan, Sri Lanka, Myanmar, Malaysia, Philippines, Peninsular Malaysia, Singapore, Thailand, Taiwan, and Viet Nam.

Description
It is a medium-sized damselfly with pale blue eyes, dark on top. They grow to 38mm in length. Its thorax is azure blue with black, broad dorsal stripes and narrow humeral stripes. Abdominal segments 1 and 2 are blue with black marks on the dorsum. Mark on segment 2 looks like a chalice or thistle-head. Segments 3 to 7 are black on dorsum and blue on the sides. Segments 8 and 9 are blue; 8 with a thick and 9 with a thin black apical annules. Segment 10 is black on dorsum and blue on the sides. Superior anal appendages are of the same length of segment 10; black and divided at the apices.

Eyes and thorax of the female is bluish green, suffused with orange, marked as in the male; but black is replaced by orange. Color of the abdomen is similar to the male; but paler. Segments 8 and 9 are also black with fine apical blue rings. Segment 10 is pale blue.

Pseudagrion microcephalum looks similar to the common bluetail and the eastern billabongfly. The female is blue-grey to grey-green in colour.

Habitat
This species can easily be found near running water or still water. They usually rest on the plants either in the middle of ponds or at the water edges. It breeds in ponds, lakes and streams. It is entirely a species of the plains, being replaced by Pseudagrion malabaricum in the neighboring hills of Western Ghats of India and Sri Lanka, and by Pseudagrion australasiae to the north-east of India and Burma.

See also
 List of odonates of India
 List of odonata of Kerala
 List of Odonata species of Australia

References

External links
Asia Dragonfly query results

Coenagrionidae
Insects described in 1842